Leszcze (German 1939-1945 Fischau)  is a village in the administrative district of Gmina Złotniki Kujawskie, within Inowrocław County, Kuyavian-Pomeranian Voivodeship, in north-central Poland.

References

Leszcze